Talinka is an urban locality (an urban-type settlement) in Oktyabrsky District of Khanty-Mansi Autonomous Okrug, Russia. Population:

References

Urban-type settlements in Khanty-Mansi Autonomous Okrug